Manuel Ugarte may refer to:

 Manuel Ugarte (footballer) (born 2001), Uruguayan footballer
 Manuel Ugarte (writer) (1875–1951), Argentine writer